Darvin may refer to:

Darvin (given name), includes list of people with the name
Darvin Furniture & Mattress, Chicago-area furniture store
Arne Darvin, fictional character in the Star Trek episode "The Trouble with Tribbles"

See also
Darwin (disambiguation)